The National Partnership Current  is a political movement in Egypt that aims to unite "advocates" of 25 January revolution and 30 June. The movement backed Hamdeen Sabahi in the 2014 Egyptian presidential election.

References

2013 establishments in Egypt
Organizations established in 2013
Political organisations based in Egypt